Stourpaine is a village and civil parish in the ceremonial county of Dorset in southern England. The A350 road, which connects Blandford to Shaftesbury to the north, passes through the village. The chalk hills of Cranborne Chase and the Dorset Downs lie immediately northeast and southwest respectively. In the 2011 census the civil parish had 277 dwellings, 265 households and a population of 617.

It was the original site of the Great Dorset Steam Fair, which has been held at nearby Tarrant Hinton in more recent years.

The joint benefice of Pimperne, Stourpaine, Durweston and Bryanston is in the Church of England Diocese of Salisbury.

History

A gift of land to the church is recorded in the Domesday Book (1086). The church of the Holy Trinity is medieval; in the 15th century the tower and nave were rebuilt in the Perpendicular style so that the nave was enlarged. Box pews were installed in the 18th century but by the 19th century the church was so dilapidated that rebuilding was undertaken (apart from the tower); the architect for the rebuilding was T. H. Wyatt.

After a funeral service at the Holy Trinity Church in Stourpaine on 16 June, Major Bruce Shand's body was cremated. The funeral of his son Mark was also at Stourpaine.

References

External links

 Village community website

Villages in Dorset